Christiaan Frederik Beyers Smit is a South African politician who has been a permanent delegate on the National Council of Provinces  since May 2014. Smit is a member of the Limpopo delegation and a party member of the Democratic Alliance.

Political career
Smit is a former PR and Executive councillor of the Mogalakwena Local Municipality. In October 2017, he was elected as one of two deputy provincial chairpersons of the Democratic Alliance.

Parliamentary career
Following the general election that was held on 7 May 2014, Smit was elected as a permanent delegate to the National Council of Provinces from Limpopo. He was sworn in as a Member of Parliament on 22 May 2014. In June 2014, he was assigned to his committees for the 2014–2019 term.

On 23 May 2019, Smit took office for his second term as a permanent delegate to the NCOP. The DA appointed him as their shadow chairperson. He was named to his new committees on 24 June 2019.

Current assignments
Joint Committee on Ethics and Members' Interests
Select Committee on Land Reform, Environment, Mineral Resources and Energy
Select Committee on Public Enterprises and Communication

Past committee assignments
Select Committee on Communications and Public Enterprises (2014–2019)
Select Committee on Land and Mineral Resources (2014–2019)

References

External links
Mr Christiaan Frederik Beyers Smit at Parliament of South Africa

Living people
Year of birth missing (living people)
Afrikaner people
People from Mogalakwena Local Municipality
Members of the National Council of Provinces
Democratic Alliance (South Africa) politicians
21st-century South African politicians